The  is a Shinto shrine in located the town of Katsuragi, Ito district, Wakayama Prefecture, Japan. The shrine is one of three shrines claiming the title of ichinomiya of Kii Province. Also known as "Amano Taisha" and "Amano Shisho Myojin", it is the head shrine of about 180 Niutsuhime Shrines around the country. Its precincts are designated a National Historic Site and the shrine is one of the constituent assets of the UNESCO World Heritage Site  Sacred Sites and Pilgrimage Routes in the Kii Mountain Range.

Overview
The shrine is located in the Amano basin, northwest of Mount  Koya in the northeastern part of Wakayama prefecture. The Kōyasan chōishi-michi, the path to Mount Koya lined with stone markers (itself a National Historic Site and World Heritage Site) passes on the ridge of the hill behind the shrine. The kasuga-zukuri style Honden and the Rōmon gate of the shrine are both National Important Cultural Properties.

There are four kami worshipped at Niutsuhime Shrine:
 , also known as 
 , also known as 
 , brought from Itsukushima Shrine in 1208
Beppyo shrines
Kanpei-taisha

History
The foundation of Niutsuhime Shrine is uncertain. Per the "Harima Kokudo Fudoki", a kami named "Niutsuhime no Mikoto" , and this has been equated with Niutsuhime Shrine. The "Harima Kokudo Fudoki" goes on to describe how Empress Jingu consulted the oracle of this shrine prior to her conquest of Korea, and the Nihon Shoki names the local Kuni no miyatsuko  as "Amano-no-Hafuri" and states that he donated red clay (cinnabar) as a token of victory. The enshrined kami, Niutsuhime-no-Ōkami, is the younger sister of Amaterasu an is credited with land clearing in parts of  Yamato province and the Kii Peninsula to bring agriculture to the land.

The location of the shrine was given as the  eastern peak of Kamitsutsuga, near the water source of the Nyukawa River. This area is still regarded as the former enshrined place of Niutsuhime Shrine,  which was relocated to its current site due to the construction of Kongōbu-ji in the early Heian period. In the Konjaku Monogatari,Takanomiko-no-Ōkami, the son of Niutsuhime-no-Ōkami assumed the form of a hunter with two black and white dogs, and led Kūkai into the mountains, where he later built Mount Koya on what was formerly the site of the shrine. The shrine was rebuilt a short distance away to be the guardian shrine of the temple. By the end of the 10th century, the shine was officially regarded as being a part of the temple. The shrine is mentioned in the 927 AD Engishiki records as receiving an annual stipend from the Court. Due to its strong connection with Mount Koya, branches of the shrine were established in many locations in conjunction with the spread of Shingon Buddhism. During the Kamakura period, the oracle of the shrine predicted the Mongol invasions of Japan, and the shrine took the lead in prayers for divine intervention which led to the Japanese victory. It came to be described in  contemporary literature as the ichinomiya of Kii Province, although there are several other shrines within Kii Province with an older claim to that title. It was the custom for pilgrims to Mount Koya to pay a visit to this shrine before visiting the temple. 

The shrine became independent of Mount Koya following the Meiji restoration, although many Buddhist relics remain within its precincts due to its long association with Mount Koya. The shrine was designated a prefectural shrine in 1873 under the Modern system of ranked Shinto shrines within State Shinto. It still retains close ties with Mount Koya, and monks reciting Buddhist sutras in front of the shrine is a common sight.

Gallery

See also
List of National Treasures of Japan (crafts-swords)
List of Historic Sites of Japan (Wakayama)

References

External links

Official Home Page

World Heritage Sites in Japan
Shinto shrines in Wakayama Prefecture
Katsuragi, Wakayama
Important Cultural Properties of Japan
Historic Sites of Japan